Blake Charlton (born 1979) is an American science fiction author. He is the author of the Spellwright series published by Tor Books and currently a cardiology fellow at the University of California, San Francisco. As a boy, Charlton had severe dyslexia. He learned to read fluently by the age of 13. As an author, he's been largely held by libraries.

Charlton's non-fiction has appeared in the Journal of the American Medical Association Internal Medicine, The British Medical Journal, and The New York Times and his science fiction short stories have appeared in the Seeds of Change and the Unfettered anthologies.

Charlton graduated summa cum laude from Yale University studying English Language and Literature and went on to graduate from Stanford Medical School.

In 2013, Blake Charlton was the IDA's (International Dyslexia Association) 12th recipient of the Pinnacle Award. The award recognizes an individual who publicly acknowledges their dyslexia and has been successful in their respective field.

The Spellwright trilogy is set in a world where languages are the basis for magic. Nicodemus Weal is a cacographer (similar to Charlton's own dyslexia), who nonetheless is talented in magical languages. However, his disability causes misspelling in any text he touches.

Bibliography

Series fiction

Spellwright trilogy 

 Spellwright (2010), Tor Books, 
 Spellbound (2011), Tor Books, 
 Spellbreaker (2016), Tor Books,

References

External links
Official website 
UCSF Profile

20th-century American novelists
1979 births
Living people
Stanford University School of Medicine alumni
Yale College alumni
University of California, San Francisco faculty
American male novelists
Writers with dyslexia
20th-century American male writers